is an infill railway station in Nakagawa-ku, Nagoya, Japan, operated by Central Japan Railway Company (JR Tōkai).

Lines
Otōbashi Station is served by the Tōkaidō Main Line, and is located 363.6 kilometers from the starting point of the line at Tokyo Station.

Station layout
The station has one curved island platform with the station building underneath. The station building has automated ticket machines, TOICA automated turnstiles and a staffed ticket office.

Platforms

Adjacent stations

|-
!colspan=5|Central Japan Railway Company

Station history
Otōbashi Station was opened on 16 March 1995 on the site of a former freight terminal operated by the Japan Freight Railway Company.

Station numbering was introduced to the section of the Tōkaidō Line operated JR Central in March 2018; Otōbashi Station was assigned station number CA67.

Passenger statistics
In fiscal 2017, the station was used by an average of 3,504 passengers daily

Surrounding area
 Nagoya Stadium

See also
 List of Railway Stations in Japan

References

Yoshikawa, Fumio. Tokaido-sen 130-nen no ayumi. Grand-Prix Publishing (2002) .

External links

Official home page

Railway stations in Japan opened in 1995
Tōkaidō Main Line
Stations of Central Japan Railway Company
Railway stations in Nagoya
Railway stations in Aichi Prefecture